Bokat is a district in Buol Regency, Central Sulawesi Province of Indonesia. It covers an area of 196.1 km2. As of the 2010 census the population was 12,609 but by the 2020 Census this had risen to 15,045. The administrative centre is in the town of the same name.

References

Districts of Central Sulawesi